The Ripley Wind Power Project is a 76 megawatt (MW) wind power project near Ripley, Ontario.

The wind farm includes 38 Enercon E-82 wind turbines, each with two megawatt rated power, 82m rotor diameter and 79m hub height as well as a transmission line and two electrical sub-stations. The wind farm is located on the shores of Lake Huron in Huron-Kinloss Township, approximately 220 kilometres west of Toronto and 140 kilometres north of London.  

The project is expected to have the capacity to generate enough zero-emission electricity to power 24,000 homes and offset approximately 66,000 tonnes of carbon dioxide annually. Project cost is estimated at $176 million Canadian dollars.

See also

List of wind farms in Canada
List of offshore wind farms

References

External links
 Canadian Wind Energy Association website
 Wind Energy Programs of Natural Resources Canada
 ENERCON homepage
  System Impact Assessment, Aug 2006
 Independent Electricity System Operator (IESO) website
Power Being Generated in Ontario by Site
"Where is my Electricity Coming From at this Hour? (if I lived in Ontario)" (Canadian Nuclear Society, with data from IESO)

Wind farms in Ontario
Buildings and structures in Bruce County